Boulton may refer to:

 Boulton (surname)
 Boulton, Derby, England

See also
 Boulton Paul Aircraft Ltd, aircraft manufacturer
 Boulton and Watt, partnership between Matthew Boulton and James Watt
 Bolton (disambiguation)